Lee Cox (born 7 April 1981) is an Australian Paralympic athlete with a vision impairment. He was born in the Victorian town of Hamilton. At the 1996 Pacific School Games, he won two gold medals in the 400 m and discus events and four silver medals in the 100 m, 200 m, long jump and triple jump events, and in 1997 he was named Most Outstanding Junior Athlete by the Australian Blind Sports Federation,. He participated in the 1999 FESPIC Games, winning two silver medals in the 400 m and triple jump events and a bronze medal in the long jump event. At the 2000 Sydney Games, he won a silver medal in the men's Pentathlon – P13 event. At the time of the games he was living in New South Wales.

References

External links
 Lee Cox – Athletics Australia Results

1981 births
Living people
Paralympic athletes of Australia
Athletes (track and field) at the 2000 Summer Paralympics
Medalists at the 2000 Summer Paralympics
Paralympic silver medalists for Australia
Visually impaired sprinters
Visually impaired long jumpers
Visually impaired triple jumpers
Paralympic sprinters
Paralympic long jumpers
Paralympic triple jumpers
Australian blind people
Sportsmen from Victoria (Australia)
Sportsmen from New South Wales
People from Hamilton, Victoria
Paralympic medalists in athletics (track and field)
FESPIC Games competitors
Australian male sprinters
Australian male long jumpers
Australian male triple jumpers
Australian pentathletes